Zygopleurage is a genus of fungi, that was placed within the Lasiosphaeriaceae family. until later analysis placed it within the Neoschizotheciaceae family.

Species
As accepted by Species Fungorum;
Zygopleurage albiziae(Syd. & P. Syd.) Arx (1962)
Zygopleurage faiyumensis 
Zygopleurage multicaudata 
Zygopleurage zygospora

References

External links

Fungi